Lucas Victor Baldin (born June 5, 1991) is a retired Brazilian footballer who lastly played for ACD Lara in the Venezuelan Primera División.

Career

Youth, College and Amateur
Baldin was a member of the Cruz Azul and Toluca youth system before moving to the United States to play college soccer at the University of South Florida.

In his career with the Bulls, Baldin made a total of 69 appearances and tallied 10 goals and nine assists.  In his senior season, he was named one of the 16 semifinalists for the Hermann Trophy. Also, he received NSCAA Scholar All-America First Team honors, as well as NSCAA East All-Region First Team, First Team All-American Athletic Conference, and American Athletic Conference All-Tournament Team honors. In 2013/2014, he was also named USF Male Scholar Athlete of the year.

During his time in college, Baldin also played in the Premier Development League for Bradenton Academics, Reading United and Seattle Sounders FC U-23.

Professional
On January 20, 2015, Baldin was selected in the fourth round (75th overall) of the 2015 MLS SuperDraft by Real Salt Lake. After excelling in preseason with Real Salt Lake, on March 6, it was announced that Baldin signed a professional contract with the Real Salt Lake organization where he became the first ever captain for Real Monarchs SLC, a USL affiliate club of RSL.  He made his professional debut on March 22 in a 0–0 draw against LA Galaxy II.

On January 25, 2016, it was announced that Baldin had been signed by Venezuelan club ACD Lara.

Nowadays, Lucas Baldin is a sports and fitness entrepreneur. He owns a college recruitment called Be One Sports and Education and a fitness studio called Carpe Diem Mindful Training. Both companies are based in Mexico City, Mexico.

References

External links
South Florida Bulls bio

1991 births
Living people
Asociación Civil Deportivo Lara players
Association football midfielders
Brazilian footballers
Brazilian expatriate footballers
Brazilian expatriate sportspeople in Mexico
Brazilian expatriate sportspeople in the United States
Brazilian expatriate sportspeople in Venezuela
Expatriate soccer players in the United States
IMG Academy Bradenton players
People from Taubaté
Reading United A.C. players
Real Salt Lake draft picks
Real Monarchs players
Seattle Sounders FC U-23 players
South Florida Bulls men's soccer players
USL Championship players
USL League Two players
Footballers from São Paulo (state)